M55E1 is the designation of a United States solid fuel rocket that is used as the first stage of several expendable launch systems.

Uses
The M55E1 is used in the following systems:
 Minuteman III
 Minotaur

Earlier versions of the Minuteman used the M55A1 for the first stage.  The US Army Homing Overlay Experiment also used the M551E1 as the first stage.

Key Facts
 Manufacturer: Thiokol
 First Launch: March 14, 1970
 Liftoff Thrust: 935,000 kN (210,196 lbf)
 Total Weight: 30,000 kg (66,000 lb)
 Diameter: 1.68 m (5.51 ft)
 Length: 16.0 m (52.00 ft)

References

Solid-fuel rockets